Empire is an unincorporated community and census-designated place (CDP) in Washoe County, Nevada, with a population estimated at 65 (2021). It is part of the Reno–Sparks Metropolitan Statistical Area; before the 2010 census, it was part of the Gerlach–Empire census-designated place.

For 63 years, from 1948 to 2011, Empire was a company town of the US Gypsum Corporation, a manufacturer of gypsum based construction sheetrock, and once had a population of more than 750 people. US Gypsum closed the mine and the town in 2011; the mine and town were bought in 2016 by the Empire Mining Company (EMC), a manufacturer of gypsum based agricultural and construction additives. In 2016, the town again became a company town under the new auspices of EMC. Since that date both the town and the mine have been partially reopened by the new owners.

History
In 1907, Alex Ranson discovered gypsum near what later became Empire. In late 1909, Alex Ranson, Nick Curnow, E. H. Cowles and James Raser filed a patent for a selenite placer mining claim. In 1922, the Pacific Portland Cement company started construction of a mill at what is now known as Empire. In 1924, the Pacific Portland Cement company completed the move of their mill to the current location of Empire from a location near Mound House, Nevada near what was then known as Empire and the Carson River mills. The company called the new plant Empire. U.S. Gypsum bought the town in 1948. Empire reached a maximum population of 750 in the early 1960s. 

Amid a slump in the construction industry, the gypsum plant in Empire closed its doors on January 31, 2011, eliminating 95 jobs. Residents with children were allowed to continue inhabiting their company homes through June 20, 2011, the end of the school year. After that date, Empire had empty homes and a large shuttered plant that made it seem almost like a ghost town. The ZIP Code, 89405, was also discontinued. During the years that the mill and town were both closed (2011 - 2016), U.S. Gypsum first erected a large fence around the entire town and plant complex; it then retained two employees to patrol and maintain the property.  It also brought two llamas onto the property to keep the grass trimmed.

In mid-2016, U.S. Gypsum sold the town and the mine to the Empire Mining Company, thus workers began to move back into the town to work under the new mine owners. Since 2016, both the mine and the town have been partially reopened by the new owners of the mine, with a total population of 65 (2021).

Geography

Climate

Demographics

Economy
Gypsum mining is the staple of Empire's economy. After the recent reopening of the town, Empire has returned to being a classic company town, though smaller than before. Once again, all residents of Empire are associated with the mining operations of the town. Until its temporary closure in 2011, the Empire gypsum mine was one of the longest continually operating mines in the U.S., operating for 88 years from 1923 to 2011. While many mines were shut down during World War II as resources were diverted to the war effort, gypsum was determined to be an "essential" resource and the mine was never closed during that period. 

During its heyday under U.S. Gypsum, the town had a church, a public pool, a nine-hole golf course, an airport, and a post office. Since EMC reopened the town in 2016, the store and gas station have been re-opened by EMC. The Catholic Church of Empire also holds services on a monthly basis.

The economy of Empire includes serving tourists heading to the nearby Black Rock Desert and hunting. Since 1991, Burning Man, a week-long experimental festival with 78,850 participants, has been held nearby. The event is responsible for around 20% of the sales at the few commercial establishments in the area, which include the closest permanent fuel and grocery stops to the event site. The Black Rock Desert is also the site of many other recreational activities throughout the year. After the closure of the plant in 2011, the grocery store remained the only source of provisions within  of the Black Rock Desert.

Transportation
Primary highway access to Empire is provided by State Route 447.

Empire Airport is a dirt airfield suitable only for light planes.

Education
Washoe County School District is the area school district. Gerlach K-12 School is the local school. It includes a branch of the Washoe County Library System.

Ernest M. Johnson Elementary School in Empire opened in 1958. Circa 2000 it had 62 students. By 2000 the school's address was already in Gerlach. The school moved to an addition at the Gerlach High School site in Gerlach in 2001. In 2011 Gerlach High was converted into the Johnson Elementary School for K-12.

In popular culture
The award-winning 2020 film Nomadland, based loosely on a true story, was partly filmed in Empire, and carefully documents some of the difficulties and adventures faced by a former Empire resident, Fern, after the closure of the town's gypsum plant. The main character is played by Frances McDormand. Fern was also a former employee at the town's Gypsum mill.  Due to the plant closure, Fern, now 62 years old, is forced to leave town, and takes up a nomadic lifestyle, living out of her van, and taking on odd jobs along the way. The film is set in 2011 and 2012, and its script intentionally omits any reference to the 2016 re-opening of the town, ending the film's story line apparently sometime before the 2016 re-opening.

External links 
 Empire Mining Company

References

Census-designated places in Nevada
Census-designated places in Washoe County, Nevada
Company towns in Nevada
Reno, NV Metropolitan Statistical Area
Populated places established in 1923
1923 establishments in Nevada